Paul Herman (born March 7, 1941) is an American athlete. He competed in the men's decathlon at the 1964 Summer Olympics.

References

1941 births
Living people
Athletes (track and field) at the 1964 Summer Olympics
American male decathletes
Olympic track and field athletes of the United States
People from Brown County, Kansas
Track and field athletes from Kansas